Concordia is a city and its surrounding municipality in the Mexican state of Sinaloa. The town is noted for manufacture of artesinal wooden furniture, symbolized by the giant chair in the town plaza. According to 2010 census, it had a population of 8,328 inhabitants.

Founded as Villa de San Sebastián in 1565 by Francisco de Ibarra, Concordia was originally a center of gold, silver and copper mining. The main church, San Sebastián, was built in 1785 with an ornate baroque facade.

Concordia is about an hour's travel southeast of Mazatlán, on the highway to Durango.

Felipe Garzón López, mayor of Concordia, blamed population increases and the drying of artisanal wells in El Palmito, Pastoría, Malpica, Amboscada, Huajote, Agua Caliente de Garate, Guásima and El Verde for water shortages. He said the solution is connection to the Picachos Dam and reservoir, as promised by President Andrés Manuel López Obrador in December 2020.

As of February 21, 2021, Concordia has reported 80 infections and 27 deaths related to the COVID-19 pandemic in Mexico that began in March 2020.

References

http://www.concordiasinaloa.com.mx/

Populated places in Sinaloa
Populated places established in 1565
1565 establishments in New Spain